Government College for Girls, Hisar is a public funded college located in  Hisar in the Indian state of Haryana.

Location
It lies on Delhi road.

Details 
The college offers BA, BCom and BSc undergraduate courses in arts, science, commerce and computers, exclusively for girls.

See also 
 List of Universities and Colleges in Hisar
 List of schools in Hisar
 List of institutions of higher education in Haryana

External links

References 

Universities and colleges in Hisar (city)
Women's universities and colleges in Haryana